= Arnabanda =

Populated place in ancient Lycia

Coordinates: 36°19′42″N 29°54′07″E

Arnabanda was a town of ancient Lycia.

Its site is located near Alacahisar, Anatolia, in modern Turkey.
